Willsey is a surname. Notable people with the surname include:

Jay Wilsey (1896–1961), American film actor
John Willsey, Canadian curler
Ray Willsey (1928–2013), American gridiron football player and coach

See also
Willey (surname)